Mateusz Sobotka (born 31 December 2004) is a Polish professional footballer who plays as a forward for Stomil Olsztyn.

Club career
Born in Działdowo, Sobotka progressed through the youth ranks of Dwójka Nidzica, Start Nidzica and Talent Warszawa, also having a short spell at Stomil Olsztyn. In February 2022, he moved to Sokół Ostróda.

FC Bayern World Squad
From July until August 2021, Sobotka spent time training with German giants Bayern Munich, as part of their "World Squad" initiative.

Career statistics

Club

Notes

References

2004 births
Living people
People from Działdowo
Polish footballers
Association football midfielders
Association football forwards
II liga players
OKS Stomil Olsztyn players
Sokół Ostróda players